The St. Anthony Hotel is a historic 10-story hotel in downtown San Antonio, Texas, USA. Built in 1909, it was considered one of the most luxurious hotels in the United States and hosted a wide range of film stars, royalty, and other famous guests. It is listed on the National Register of Historic Places.

History

The St. Anthony Hotel was constructed by cattlemen B. L. Naylor, F. M. Swearingen, and A. H. Jones. The men believed that San Antonio was destined to become an important tourist destination and that a luxury hotel would bring an influx of wealthy people coming to the city.

The St. Anthony was the first luxury hotel in the city. All the rooms had mahogany moldings and furnishings and telephones, Half of the rooms had private baths. It also featured doors which opened automatically, and electric lights that turned off when the patron locked their hotel room door. It was so technologically advanced that it was considered among the world's most modern hotels. The hotel also featured a richly appointed bar and lounge named "Peacock Alley", added in the 1930s. The hotel's St. Anthony Club restaurant also became well known for its excellent food. In 1915, the owners doubled the capacity of the hotel to 430 rooms.

In the depths of the Great Depression, however, the hotel fell on difficult times. It began to deteriorate, and the banks foreclosed on the owners. Ralph W. Morrison, civic leader and rancher, purchased the hotel in 1935 for $475,000. That year, the hotel added air conditioning and a drive-up registration desk. Morrison purchased an extensive art collection to hang in the public spaces, and oriental carpets and French Empire furnishings for the public lounges.

In 1982 the hotel was bought by Inter-Continental Hotels. It was renovated and reopened in 1983 as the St. Anthony Inter-Continental San Antonio. It completed renovations and joined The Luxury Collection on November 19, 2015.

Famous guests
The St. Anthony Hotel has hosted a number of famous people. These include President Franklin D. Roosevelt, President Dwight D. Eisenhower, General Douglas MacArthur, Vice President John Nance Garner, and humorist Will Rogers. Lyndon B. Johnson spent his honeymoon there. The Newton Gang often resided there in the winter. The hotel was also home to the cast of the first film to win the Academy Award for Best Picture, Wings. Stars of the film that stayed at the hotel included Richard Arlen, Charles "Buddy" Rogers and Clara Bow.

In 2012, the hotel hosted the Arena Football University. At this event, arena football teams meet with vendors and league officials to discuss the upcoming season.

Famous deaths
Samuel Gompers, president of the American Federation of Labor, died in the hotel on December 13, 1924.

Texas politician Robert L. Bobbitt lived in the St. Anthony for the last year of his life prior to his death in 1972.

In the moments leading up to his death, Major General Frederick Funston, who President Woodrow Wilson favored as leader of the American Expeditionary Force in the First World War, was relaxing in the lobby of the hotel listening to The Blue Danube Waltz. After commenting, "How beautiful it all is," he collapsed from a massive painful heart attack (myocardial infarction) and died on February 19, 1917. He was holding six-year old Inez Harriet Silverberg in his arms. Wilson was forced to choose General John Pershing as a replacement.

References

Bibliography

External links

Hotel buildings completed in 1909
Hotel buildings on the National Register of Historic Places in Texas
Hotels in San Antonio
National Register of Historic Places in San Antonio